Abu Naser (born 7 April 1999) is a Bangladeshi cricketer. He made his List A debut for Gazi Group Cricketers in the 2017–18 Dhaka Premier Division Cricket League on 5 February 2018.

References

External links
 

1999 births
Living people
Bangladeshi cricketers
Gazi Group cricketers
Place of birth missing (living people)